Bare Essence is an American prime time soap opera television series which aired on NBC from February 15 to June 13, 1983, during the 1982–83 season. It starred Genie Francis as Tyger Hayes, and explored the intrigues of the perfume industry.

Miniseries (1982)
Bare Essence first appeared in the form of a two-part, 4-hour TV miniseries shown over two nights on October 4 and 5, 1982 on CBS. Based on the 1980 novel of the same name by Meredith Rich, it was directed by Walter Grauman and written by Robert Hamilton. The miniseries starred Bruce Boxleitner as Chase Marshall, Linda Evans as Lady Bobbi Rowan, Genie Francis as Bobbi's daughter Patricia "Tyger" Hayes, Lee Grant as Ava Marshall, Joel Higgins as Matt Phillips and Donna Mills as Barbara Fisher. Francis Benard, John Dehner, Jonathan Frakes, Susan French, Belinda Montgomery and Tim Thomerson appeared in supporting roles. It garnered excellent ratings, but CBS passed on a proposed series, which NBC picked up instead. By the time the series went to air in February 1983, the roles which had been played in the miniseries by Evans, Mills, Grant, and Boxleitner were taken over respectively by Jennifer O'Neill, Jaime Lyn Bauer, Jessica Walter and Al Corley. Francis reprised the lead role of Tyger in the new series.

Weekly series (1983)

Synopsis
Bare Essence starred Genie Francis, Ian McShane, Jennifer O'Neill, Jessica Walter and Michael Woods, with Jamie Lyn Bauer, Laura Bruneau, John Dehner, Jonathan Frakes, Susan French and Wendy Fulton in supporting roles. The show revolves around the efforts of Tyger Hayes (Francis) to succeed in the business world. In the first episode, her new husband Chase Marshall (guest star Al Corley) is killed in a racing car accident. Chase's father Hadden (Dehner) opposes Tyger's efforts to join the family business, Kellico, but she is encouraged by Hadden's sister Margaret (French) to try her hand with a new line of perfumes. Ava (Walter), the widow of Hadden's other son, is concerned that any success Tyger might have will undermine the position of her son Marcus (Frakes) in the company. Ava plots with Marcus' wife Muffin (Fulton) to undermine Tyger's success. It is later revealed that Muffin had Tyger's husband killed when she had someone sabotage his car. Ava eventually seduces and marries Hadden. Tyger's mother, Lady Bobbi Rowan (O'Neill), falls in love with a Greek millionaire, Niko Theopolous (Ian McShane), who wants to exact revenge on the Marshalls. Penny Fuller and Morgan Stevens join the cast midway through the season, while Ted LePlat, Richard Backus, Anulka Dziubinska, Paula Holland and Michael Nader appear in recurring roles.

Reception
Despite a great deal of promotion (with commercials like "Love her. Use her. Or destroy her. Everyone wants a piece of Tyger Hayes."), Bare Essence was unsuccessful and canceled after its first season, with cliffhangers left unresolved. Christopher Schemering called the series "a routine story of murder and family mayhem" in The Soap Opera Encyclopedia, describing Walter's Ava as "a stock villainess obviously modeled on Joan Collins's Alexis in Dynasty." Tom Shales of The Washington Post wrote that Bare Essence "comes up lacking on almost all counts. A better title would be Bare Minimum." He praised the female cast members, but noted that "writer-director Walter Grauman has given this talent little to do that isn't ridiculous on the face of it."

Cast

Episodes

Miniseries (1979)

Season 1 (1980)

US TV ratings

References

External links
  (1982 TV movie)
  (1983 TV series)

1980s American television miniseries
1982 American television series debuts
1983 American television series endings
1980s American LGBT-related drama television series
American television soap operas
American primetime television soap operas
English-language television shows
NBC original programming
Television series by Warner Bros. Television Studios
Television shows set in Seattle